KIFW (1230 AM) is a radio station broadcasting a Classic Hits, Oldies, Full-Service format. Licensed to Sitka, Alaska, United States, the station serves the Alaska Panhandle area.  The station is owned by Alaska Broadcast Communications, and features programming from ABC Radio.

The studios for KIFW and its sister station KSBZ are at 611 Lake Street in Sitka.

Programming
The station primarily broadcasts adult contemporary music but also airs a "Problem Corner" show where listeners call concerning local issues, among other subjects. KIFW also broadcasts Sitka High School sports games and airs live coverage of the Sitka Salmon Derby. In January 2000, KSBZ switched to a country music format. In 2006, KSBZ switched formats again, this time to an active rock format, before finally settling on a classic rock format a year later. In January 2020, KIFW transferred all its Adult Contemporary programming over to KSBZ which relaunched as a Hot AC radio station, rebranding as "Mix 103"; KIFW meanwhile inherited the former Classic rock programming once heard over on KSBZ during its "Rock 103"/"The Rock" days as Classic Hits, continuing to be known on-air as The Sound of Sitka.

References

External links 

Classic hits radio stations in the United States
Oldies radio stations in the United States
IFW
Sitka, Alaska
Radio stations established in 1949
1949 establishments in Alaska